See also, James Rhyne Killian, 10th president of MIT.

James Kilian (born October 24, 1980) is a former professional gridiron football quarterback. Kilian played football and basketball at Medford High School in Medford, Oklahoma, making him one of the few 8-man or 6-man athletes to be drafted to the NFL in recent years. He played college football for the Tulsa Golden Hurricane and started at quarterback for the 2001 and 2002 seasons. He placed himself for draft eligibility as a junior. Kilian was drafted in the seventh round of the 2005 NFL Draft by the Kansas City Chiefs.

Kilian was also a member of the Atlanta Falcons, Indianapolis Colts, Nashville Kats and Winnipeg Blue Bombers.

Kilian is currently the head coach at St. Olaf College in Northfield, Minnesota. Previously, he coached at the University of St. Thomas,  University of Tulsa, and Louisiana State University.

Head coaching record

References

External links
 St. Olaf profile
 Tulsa Golden Hurricane bio
 Just Sports Stats

1980 births
Living people
American football quarterbacks
Canadian football quarterbacks
American players of Canadian football
Atlanta Falcons players
Indianapolis Colts players
Kansas City Chiefs players
Nashville Kats players
St. Olaf Oles football coaches
Tulsa Golden Hurricane football players
Winnipeg Blue Bombers players
People from Caldwell, Kansas
People from Medford, Oklahoma
Players of American football from Kansas